Najmadeen Mala (1898 in Sulaymaniyah – 23 April 1962 in Sulaymaniyah) was a Kurdish writer, journalist and teacher. Najmadeen was the son of Mullah Ghafur Mullah Ali. He worked in Ranya but moved to Halab in Syria.

Later, he returned to Sulaimani and founded a school, which he ran for 40 years. He also owned a book store.

Literary career
He had a weekly column called "Child Story" in the newspaper Zheen. He wrote biographies on notable figures and poets. He published more than 90 stories, most of them folkloric.

He wrote several valuable works on Kurdish history and literature. Najmadeen Mala died on 23 April 1962, and was buried on Azmar Mountain in Sulaimani.

References

Kurdsat TV

1898 births
1962 deaths
Kurdish-language writers
Iraqi Kurdish people
Iraqi emigrants to Syria